Marlowe may refer to:

Name
 Christopher Marlowe (1564–1593), English dramatist, poet and translator
 Pat Marlowe (1933–1962), English socialite
 Philip Marlowe, fictional hardboiled detective created by author Raymond Chandler
 Marlowe (name), including list of people and characters with the surname or given name

Places
 Marlowe Theatre, in Canterbury, England, UK
 Marlowe, West Virginia, an unincorporated community in the United States
 Marlowe Consolidated School, listed on the U.S. National Register of Historic Places
  Marlowes, a major street in the town of Hemel Hempstead in Hertfordshire, England, UK

Performing arts
 Marlowe (musical), loosely based on the life of Christopher Marlowe
 Marlowe (1969 film), a drama based on a story by Raymond Chandler
 Marlowe (2007 film), a TV pilot about Philip Marlowe
 Marlowe (2022 film), an American neo-noir thriller film
 Marlowe Brothers, stage name of pianists Jeffrey and Ronald Marlowe
 Where's Marlowe?, 1998 comedy/mystery film
 Philip Marlowe, Private Eye, television mystery series airing from 1983 to 1986

See also
 Marlow (disambiguation)